The F2004 is a highly successful Formula One racing car that was used by Ferrari for the 2004 Formula One season. The chassis was designed by Rory Byrne, Ignazio Lunetta, Aldo Costa, Marco Fainello, John Iley and James Allison with Ross Brawn playing a vital role in leading the production of the car as the team's Technical Director and Paolo Martinelli assisted by Giles Simon leading the engine design and operations. 

Heavily based on the previous season's F2003-GA, the F2004 continued the run of success the team had enjoyed since 1999, winning the team's 6th straight Constructors' Championship and 5th straight Drivers' Championship for Michael Schumacher, his 7th, and final, world drivers' title in 2004. It is one of the most dominant cars in the history of Formula One. The car also brought a close to Ferrari's and Michael Schumacher's five-year domination of the sport, leaving the door open for Renault and Fernando Alonso. 

Ferrari used 'Marlboro' logos, except at the Canadian, United States, French and British Grands Prix.

Design

The car was based on the same design principles pioneered in the F2002 but taken a step further. The periscope exhausts were smaller and mounted closer to the car's centre line, the rear wing was enlarged and the rear suspension redesigned to reduce tyre wear, a major problem in the F2003-GA. The engine was designed to last a full weekend in accordance with the FIA's technical regulations for the season. As a result, the gearbox also had to be redesigned to be more resilient. The rear end aerodynamics were improved and the car featured a shorter wheelbase. These electronic driver aids had been used by the team for the previous three seasons, since the 2001 Spanish Grand Prix.

Performance

The car was as successful as the equally dominant F2002, winning 15 out of 18 races, and scoring 12 pole positions including many lap records. Michael Schumacher won 13 races, setting a single-season record (Sebastian Vettel equaled this number in 2013) which lasted until 2022 when Max Verstappen won 15 races, and gained a record breaking seventh World Championship (since equaled by Lewis Hamilton in 2020), while Ferrari was a clear winner in the Constructors' Championship. The F2004 was also extremely reliable, retiring from just two races and both of these were via collisions. In France, Schumacher won, beating Fernando Alonso's Renault  after an innovative four stop pit strategy.

After the 2004 season the car was developed further as a testbed for 2005 and used in the first two races. Despite a podium finish in the 2005 Australian Grand Prix, the car was retired to make way for its successor, the F2005, at the 2005 Bahrain Grand Prix.

In all, the car scored 272 championship points in its career, but its championship in 2004 also marked the end of Ferrari's Constructors' Championship winning streak, beginning with the 1999 Formula One season.

The F2004 was used as the basis for the 2008 "Powered by Ferrari" A1 Grand Prix car.

Legacy
The fastest race laps at Magny-Cours, Monza and Shanghai remain the current lap records, despite two out of these three tracks remaining on the F1 calendar through the 2019 season, showing the competitiveness of the F2004 against modern cars some fifteen years younger.

Michael Schumacher's son Mick drove the car at the 2019 German Grand Prix, honouring 15 years since his father's final world championship.

Mick Schumacher also drove the car around the track before the start of the 2020 Tuscan Grand Prix to celebrate Ferrari's 1000th Grand Prix.

Complete Formula One results
(key) (results in bold indicate pole position, results in italics indicate fastest lap) 

* 10 points scored with the F2004M

See also

 Ferrari F2002
 Ferrari F2003-GA
 Ferrari F2005

References

F2004
2004 Formula One season cars
2005 Formula One season cars
Formula One championship-winning cars